The women's triple jump event at the 2023 European Athletics Indoor Championships will be held on 3 March at 11:10 (qualification) and 4 March at 19:50 (final) local time.

Medalists

Records

Results

Qualification
Qualification: Qualifying performance 14.10 (Q) or at least 8 best performers (q) advance to the Final.

Final

References

2023 European Athletics Indoor Championships
Triple jump at the European Athletics Indoor Championships